Khalil Al-Rifa'i, (July 7, 1927 in Baghdad – October 8, 2006 in Erbil) was an Iraqi actor. He appeared in the television programs Tahit Moos Al-Hallaq (1961-1969) and Abu Balawi (1980),

References

1927 births
2006 deaths
20th-century Iraqi male actors
People from Baghdad
Iraqi male television actors